The 2021–22 Dallas Stars season was the 55th season for National Hockey League franchise that was established on June 5, 1967, and the 29th season since the franchise relocated from Minnesota prior to the start of the 1993–94 NHL season. On April 27, 2022, the Stars clinched a playoff berth despite a 4–3 overtime loss to the Arizona Coyotes.

Standings

Divisional standings

Conference standings

Schedule and results

Regular season
The regular season schedule was published on July 22, 2021 with only about a handful of games scheduled in February because NHL players are planning to participate in the 2022 Winter Olympics. On December 22, 2021, the NHL announced that players would not participate in the Olympics due to the rise of COVID-19 cases worldwide.

Playoffs

Player statistics

Skaters

Goaltenders

†Denotes player spent time with another team before joining the Stars. Stats reflect time with the Stars only.
‡Denotes player was traded mid-season. Stats reflect time with the Stars only.
Bold/italics denotes franchise record.

Transactions
The Stars have been involved in the following transactions during the 2021–22 season.

Trades

Notes:
 Arizona will receive a 3rd-round pick in 2023 if Dallas qualifies for the 2022 Stanley Cup playoffs.

Players acquired

Players lost

Signings

Draft picks

Below are the Dallas Stars' selections at the 2021 NHL Entry Draft, which were held on July 23 to 24, 2021. It was held virtually via Video conference call from the NHL Network studio in Secaucus, New Jersey.

References

Dallas Stars seasons
Dallas Stars
Dallas Stars
Dallas Stars